Raha may refer to:

Raha (Vidhan Sabha constituency), an assembly constituency of Assam, India
Raha, Assam, a village in India
Raha, Indonesia
Raha, Nepal, a village in Dolpa district